Aislan Paulo Lotici Back (born 11 January 1988 in Realeza), or simply Aislan, is a Brazilian central defender who plays for Akritas Chlorakas.

Career
Central defender race and disposition, was revealed in the youth of São Paulo, where he arrived in 2004.

Struck early in the Campeonato Brasileiro Série A 2010 he went to the Guarani of Campinas.

He signed in 2012 for the Swiss Club FC Sion.

Career statistics
Updated 12 August 2010

Career honours
São Paulo
Brazilian League: 1
 2008

External links

saopaulofc.net 
CBF 

Aislan at ZeroZero

1988 births
Living people
Brazilian footballers
Brazilian expatriate footballers
Brazilian expatriate sportspeople in Switzerland
Expatriate footballers in Switzerland
Brazilian expatriate sportspeople in Cyprus
Expatriate footballers in Cyprus
São Paulo FC players
Guarani FC players
FC Sion players
Madureira Esporte Clube players
CR Vasco da Gama players
Tupi Football Club players
Clube Náutico Capibaribe players
Othellos Athienou F.C. players
Akritas Chlorakas players
Cypriot Second Division players
Campeonato Brasileiro Série A players
Swiss Super League players
Association football defenders